Luis Javier García Sanz (born 24 June 1978) is a Spanish former professional footballer who played as a winger.

Although naturally left-footed, he was skilled with both feet and had a good aerial game, despite a small frame. He played professionally for Barcelona and Atlético Madrid in his homeland, amongst others – being brought up in the former's youth ranks – appearing abroad for Liverpool, with whom he won the 2005 Champions League and the 2006 FA Cup.

Over the course of eight seasons, García amassed La Liga totals of 150 games and 22 goals. A Spanish international for three years, he earned 20 caps and represented the nation at the 2006 World Cup. García now works as a football analyst for ESPN.

Club career

Barcelona
Born in Badalona, Barcelona, Catalonia, García began playing football with local CF Badalona at the age of 6, arriving in FC Barcelona's youth ranks six years later from neighbours CE Sant Gabriel. After two successful seasons with their reserves, he left on loan for Real Valladolid, where he made his La Liga debut on 22 August 1999 in a 0–1 away loss against CD Numancia. He finished the campaign at Segunda División's CD Toledo also on loan, his four goals not being enough to prevent relegation for the Castile-La Mancha side; on 18 August 1998, he had made his first competitive appearance for the Blaugrana, coming on as 78th-minute substitute for Boudewijn Zenden in a 1–2 defeat at RCD Mallorca in the Supercopa de España.

Subsequently, García played another year in the second level, being instrumental in CD Tenerife's promotion by scoring 16 league goals under the guidance of manager Rafael Benítez. Loaned for the fourth time by Barcelona, he returned to Valladolid for 2001–02, netting seven top-division goals in 25 matches, including two in a 5–1 away victory over Tenerife.

Atlético Madrid
In the 2002–03 season, García was sold to Atlético Madrid for €3.6 million but, after a highly successful individual campaign (nine league goals), Barcelona activated a clause which allowed the player's return for an additional €1.4 million. At the Camp Nou he had another good year, helping the team to the second place in the league, five points behind champions Valencia CF.

Liverpool
García was signed by former Tenerife coach Benítez for Liverpool on 20 August 2004, on a five-year contract for a fee of £6 million. He was the fourth Spaniard signed by the club that summer and, nine days after arriving, made his Premier League debut in a 0–1 away loss to Bolton Wanderers, where he had an apparently legitimate goal ruled out for offside; his first goal with his new club came against West Bromwich Albion at Anfield on 11 September, concluding a 3–0 win, and he went on to net seven more times in the league that season, including the headed winner in the Merseyside derby against Everton on 20 March 2005.

García was also a key player in Liverpool's successful campaign in the UEFA Champions League, scoring winning goals against Juventus F.C. and Chelsea (a controversial one in the fourth minute, dubbed a "ghost goal" by Chelsea manager José Mourinho), in the quarter-finals and semi-finals, respectively. Having appeared in the final against A.C. Milan, he finished his first season in English football with 13 successful strikes in all competitions.

García did not make so much of an impact in the 2005–06 campaign, although he weighed in with some vital goals, including a lofted finish against Chelsea to put them out of the FA Cup in the semi-finals. He was suspended for the final victory against West Ham United, having been sent off in a league game just days after his semi-final winner, coincidentally also against West Ham. Early into the season, he also scored the third goal in the Reds 2005 UEFA Super Cup final defeat of PFC CSKA Moscow.

On 10 January 2007, following the 3–6 loss to Arsenal in the League Cup which was his final game for Liverpool, it was confirmed by the club that García had ruptured the anterior cruciate ligament (ACL) in his right knee during the game. He would be out for at least six months.

His positive relationship with club fans was in great measure due to the fact of his decisive goals against Chelsea. It was further underlined by the song frequently sung in his honour, to the tune of "You Are My Sunshine": "Luis García, he drinks Sangria/he came from Barça to bring us joy!/He's five-foot seven, he's football heaven/So please don't take our Luis away!" In the 2013 poll of the 100 Players Who Shook the Kop, García ranked 34th. All in all he scored 30 goals in 121 appearances for Liverpool, with ten coming in the Champions League, five in the knockout stages of the 2005 triumph.

Return to Spain
In early July 2007, García signed with former team Atlético Madrid for around £4 million, with his transfer being negotiated between the two clubs around the same time that they were arranging a deal for Fernando Torres in the opposite direction. Nonetheless, these deals were conducted separately.

After a first season, where he played mainly as backup to Portugal's Simão Sabrosa, though still managing 30 league appearances, with García playing both matches against former side Liverpool in the following campaign's Champions League group stage. On 4 November 2008, he came on as a late substitute at Anfield to appreciative applause. During the league, however, he fell out of favour, appearing mainly from the bench and sometimes not even making the list of 18.

On 11 August 2009, it was confirmed García had reached an agreement with Racing de Santander. His season was quite unassuming, as he appeared in only 15 league matches without scoring and the Cantabrians narrowly avoided relegation.

Later years
On 28 August 2010, García signed a one-year contract with Greek club Panathinaikos FC. On 4 September he flew back to Anfield to take part in Carragher's testimonial match, scoring a goal in the second minute. He returned to the Camp Nou ten days later, playing the last 20 minutes in a 1–5 loss in the Champions League group stage.

On 1 July 2011, 33-year-old García signed with Mexican team Puebla FC. He scored his first goal for La Franja on the 24th, through a penalty kick away to Atlas FC (1–0).

In early June 2012, García signed for another club in the Liga MX, Club Universidad Nacional, joining alongside Martín Romagnoli for an undisclosed fee. He made his official debut against Atlas, playing 34 minutes from the bench.

On 14 January 2014, aged 35, García announced his retirement from football. He made the announcement on his official website, saying, "Today I've decided to retire as a professional footballer, thanks for the interest from the teams that spoke with me in recent weeks, but I think the time has come to end this important chapter in my life and move to the next page."

García came out of retirement in July 2014, joining newly formed Indian Super League franchise Atlético de Kolkata as their marquee player ahead of the league's inaugural season, the first of such players to join the league. He started in the league's opening match, as his new team won 3–0 at home against Mumbai City FC. On 21 November he had a wrongly disallowed goal in an eventual 1–2 loss at Kerala Blasters FC but, despite finishing the regular season in third, Kolkata won the league final against the same opponent, although he was an unused substitute; he also won the league's Manyavar Most Exciting Player award.

Due to concerns over his injury record, García was not retained for the 2015 campaign. On 16 January 2016, he signed for Central Coast Mariners FC initially until the end of the season. He made his debut one week later, coming off the bench and playing a role in his team's goal in a 1–2 loss to Western Sydney Wanderers FC. In the next match, against Wellington Phoenix FC, he was again used as a substitute, scoring one goal and setting up two more in a 3–1 win.

García served as a pundit for beIN Sports during their coverage of the UEFA Euro 2016.

International career
After a productive first season with Liverpool, García made his debut for the Spain national team on 26 March 2005, appearing in a 3–0 friendly defeat of China in Salamanca. On 12 November of that year, he scored a hat-trick in a 5–1 home victory over Slovakia for the 2006 FIFA World Cup qualification play-offs.

García was then chosen as part of the nation's squad-of-23 for the finals in Germany. He started in wins against Ukraine and Tunisia, and was used as a substitute in the round-of-16 1–3 loss to France.

Career statistics
Club

International

International goals

Honours
ClubLiverpoolFA Cup: 2005–06García missed the 2006 FA Cup final due to suspension. However, additional medals are awarded by The Football Association.
FA Community Shield: 2006
Football League Cup runner-up: 2004-05
UEFA Champions League: 2004–05; runner-up 2006–07
UEFA Super Cup: 2005
FIFA Club World Championship runner-up: 2005Atlético MadridUEFA Intertoto Cup: 2007Atlético KolkataIndian Super League: 2014

IndividualAwards'
UEFA Team of the Year: 2005

References

External links

 
 
 Liverpool historic profile
 
 
 
 

1978 births
Living people
People from Badalona
Sportspeople from the Province of Barcelona
Spanish footballers
Footballers from Catalonia
Association football wingers
La Liga players
Segunda División players
Segunda División B players
FC Barcelona Atlètic players
FC Barcelona players
Real Valladolid players
CD Toledo players
CD Tenerife players
Atlético Madrid footballers
Racing de Santander players
Premier League players
Liverpool F.C. players
Super League Greece players
Panathinaikos F.C. players
Liga MX players
Club Puebla players
Club Universidad Nacional footballers
Indian Super League players
Indian Super League marquee players
ATK (football club) players
A-League Men players
Marquee players (A-League Men)
Central Coast Mariners FC players
UEFA Champions League winning players
Spain international footballers
2006 FIFA World Cup players
Catalonia international footballers
Spanish expatriate footballers
Expatriate footballers in England
Expatriate footballers in Greece
Expatriate footballers in Mexico
Expatriate footballers in India
Expatriate soccer players in Australia
Spanish expatriate sportspeople in England
Spanish expatriate sportspeople in Greece
Spanish expatriate sportspeople in Mexico
Spanish expatriate sportspeople in India
Spanish expatriate sportspeople in Australia
Dual internationalists (football)